The Alethopteridaceae are a family of extinct plants belonging to Pteridospermatophyta, or seed ferns.

References

Pteridospermatophyta
Carboniferous plants
Permian plants
Prehistoric plant families
Carboniferous first appearances
Permian extinctions